Logan Yuzna (born ) is a film producer and director.

In spring 2009, Yuzna was accepted as a transfer student at the University of California, Los Angeles (UCLA) from Santa Monica College where he was "a European Studies major."

Also known as "Raisinman", Yuzna is a film producer and director.  In 2022, Yuzna was attached to direct the heist film Stealing McCloud.

References

External links
 

1980s births
American film directors
American film producers
Living people